The 34th Combat Communications Squadron (34 CBCS) was a United States Air Force combat communications squadron, located at Tinker AFB.

Mission

History
The unit emblem was designed by SrA Steve Carter in 1995, who would later go on to retire as a TSgt.  SrA Carter was tasked to draft something without direction, "Carter, you're an artist.  We need an idea for an emblem by end of day."  The artist had been reading Robert E. Howard's Conan the Barbarian books that week and, on short notice, drafted the emblem in a rough form and submitted it that day. The emblem consisted of a black anthropomorphic bull wielding a broadsword in one hand and holding a globe in the other.  The broadsword originally broke out from the border, which is not allowed in Air Force heraldry.

By popular vote, the squadron chose this design over others submitted.  It would later morph into its final version with a red bull.

Assignments

Major Command
Air Force Space Command (2009 – 2013)
Air Combat Command (1993 – 2009)

Wing/Group
689th Combat Communications Wing (2009 – 2013)
3d Combat Communications Group (1993 – 2013)

Previous designations
34th Combat Communications Squadron (1993 – 2013)

Bases stationed
Tinker AFB, Oklahoma (1993 – 2013)

Commanders
Maj Mark Smith (1993–1995)
Maj Singleton (1995–1997)
Lt Col Dick Palmieri (2003–2005)
Lt Col Steve Sweeney (2005–2007)
Maj Anthony Gamboa (2007–2009)
Maj Noland Greene (2009–2011)
Lt Col Shelly Prescod (2011–2012)
Lt Col Anthony Montelepre (2012 – 2013)

Decorations
Air Force Outstanding Unit Award 
Meritorious Unit Commendation

See also
3d Combat Communications Group

References

External links
Tinker AFB, Oklahoma
34 CBCS Final Change of Command (Lt Col Prescod to Maj Montelepre) Video

Combat Communications 0034
Military units and formations in Oklahoma